Kabir Waraich is an Indian racing driver.  He has won Ultimate Desert Challenge Bikaner 3 times consecutively.

Background 
Waraich hailing from Sangrur, Punjab. He completed his schooling from his hometown and graduation from Chandigarh. Waraich started his racing career in 2008. He is the 1st Indian to participate in Rain Forest Malaysia. He finished 3rd overall in 2014 & 2015 RFC India. He has won Ultimate Dessert Challenge Bikaner 3 times consecutively. He is also the founder of The Gerrari Offroaders.

Career

2011 
1st in Patiala Speed Fest - (PB) Off-road 4x4
1st in OYA (Mohali) - Autocross Off-road 4x4

2012 
1st in Uncaged Summer Challenge (Derabassi)
1st in Uncaged Winter Challenge (Derabassi)
Finalist in Mahindra Offroad Trophy

2013 
4th in Mahindra Offroad Trophy (MH)
2nd in Aravali Offroad Challenge (Aravali)
Selected for Pallar Challenge (Chennai)
Selected for Mahindra (Ggn) Offroad Trophy
1st in OYA Offroad Challenge (Mohali)
1st in Uncaged (Derabassi)

2014 
3rd in RFC 2014 (Goa)
1st OYA Offroad Challenge
5th in Mahindra Offroad Challenge (Mh)
Official Desert Storm

2015 
3rd in RFC (Goa)
1st in Polaris Offroad
1st in Mahindra Escape (Chd) Official Desert Storm
1st in OYA Autocross
Judge in EVO offroad Magazine

2016 
6 Fastest Stages in Royal Rajasthan Rally
1st in The Uitimate Desert Challenge (UDO)
2nd Orange JK4x4 fury- DAMBUK
2nd in Club Challenge

2017 
1st in The Ultimate Desert Challenge (UDC)
1st in JK4x4 fury -DAMBUK

2018 
1st in JK Tyre 4 play (kikar) Ropar
2nd in Dirt Drif (Auto cross)
1st in Dirt Drif (Offroad)
2nd in Orange JK 4x4 fury- DAMBUK

2019 
1st in UDC (Hat Trick)
1st in OYA Autocross
1st in OYA Offroad
1st in SlushX

2020 
1st position in 9th OYA Autocross, Motocross and Offroading challenge

References 

Living people
Indian racing drivers
People from Sangrur district
Year of birth missing (living people)